Chettuva Backwater or Lanchi Velayudhan's Chettuva is located in between Engandiyur Panchayat and Kadappuram Panchayat of Thrissur District in Kerala. The backwaters start at Enamakkal Lake and empties to Arabian Sea. The destination is blessed with mangroves, Chinese fishing nets, islands, migratory birds, estuary and a fort. The mangroves at Chettuva backwaters are famous around the world, it is also knows as Lanchi Velayudhan backwater, He have helped many to reach in Dubai in 90's with his boat. In 2010, Government of Kerala has declared Chettuva as heritage village.

Major attractions
 William Fort
 Chettuva Bungalow
 Raja Islands 
 Chettuva Harbour

References

External links

Geography of Thrissur district
Tourist attractions in Thrissur district